Furcopenis is a genus of gastropods belonging to the family Agriolimacidae.

The species of this genus are found in Pyrenees.

Species:

Furcopenis circularis 
Furcopenis darioi 
Furcopenis gallaeciensis 
Furcopenis geresiensis

References

Agriolimacidae